The Mizrachi (Tnuat HaMizrahi) is a religious Zionist organization founded in 1902 in Vilnius at a world conference of religious Zionists called by Rabbi Yitzchak Yaacov Reines. Bnei Akiva, which was founded in 1929, is the youth movement associated with Mizrachi. Both Mizrachi and the Bnei Akiva youth movement continued to function as international movements. Here the word "Mizrahi" is a notarikon (a kind of acronym)  for  "Merkaz Ruhani" lit. Spiritual centre: מרכז רוחני, introduced by rabbi Samuel Mohilever.

Mizrachi believes that the Torah should be at the centre of Zionism and also sees Jewish nationalism as a means of achieving religious objectives. The Mizrachi Party was the first official religious Zionist party and founded the Ministry of Religious Affairs in Israel and pushed for laws enforcing kashrut and the observance of the sabbath in the workplace. It also played a role prior to the creation of the state of Israel, building a network of religious schools that exist to this day, and took part in the 1951 elections.

In Poland
During the interwar period, the Mizrachi party  was represented in the kehilla councils as well as in the municipal councils and in the Polish Sejm and Senate, e.g. by the Vilnius Chief Rabbi Yitzhak Rubinstein (1888-1945), Mizrachi senator (1922-1930, 1938–1939) and deputy (1930-1935), and by Rabbi Simon Federbusch, Sejm member from 1922 until 1927.

In Israel
Major figures in the Religious Zionist Movement include Rabbi Abraham Isaac Kook who became the Ashkenazi Jews Chief Rabbi of the British Mandate of Palestine in 1924 and tried to reconcile Zionism with Orthodox Judaism.

Mizrachi had a separate trade union wing, founded in 1921, Hapoel HaMizrachi, which represented religious Jews in the Histadrut and tried to attract religious Labor Zionists. The trade union also operated as a political party by the same name in the early days of Israel's existence, becoming the fourth largest party in the 1951 elections.

In 1956, the Mizrachi party and Hapoel HaMizrachi merged to form the National Religious Party to advance the rights of religious Jews in Israel, having fought the 1955 election together as the National Religious Front. The party was an ever-present government coalition member until 1992. In 2008, the party merged into The Jewish Home, essentially a successor party.

In the United States

In the United States the ideals of and work of the Mizrachi movement have been carried out through the official Religious Zionists of America (RZA) movement that has been an important source of the ideology and guidance for Modern Orthodox Judaism and its rabbis and followers. It is affiliated with the Bnei Akiva youth movement which has a great influence on the Modern Orthodox Jewish day schools and synagogues. The American movement has served as a fundraising and lobbying arm for its Israeli counterparts.

Many of the Jewish leaders and rabbis of Yeshiva University actively identify with and support Mizrachi.

See also
Religious Zionist Movement

External links
World Mizrachi Movement
Mizrachi Vienna- Austria
A Historical Look at Religious Zionism by Prof. Dan Michman 
Modern Orthodoxy vs. Religious Zionism; are they the same thing? Rabbi Yair Spitz
Jüdische Wochenschrift, B249, a digitized German-language periodical published by Mizrachi, at the Leo Baeck Institute, New York

Religious Zionism
Religious Zionist organizations
Jewish organizations established in 1902
1902 establishments in Lithuania